A kinsman is a male relative (see kinship).

The term kinsman (or plural kinsmen) may also refer to:

Places in the United States
Kinsman, Illinois
Kinsman, Ohio
Kinsman Township, Trumbull County, Ohio
Kinsman Mountain, in the White Mountains of New Hampshire
Kinsman Notch, a mountain pass in New Hampshire

People
Brent Kinsman (born 1997), American child actor
Frederick Joseph Kinsman (1868–1944), American clergyman
Gary Kinsman (born 1955), Canadian sociologist
Jeremy Kinsman (born 1942), Canadian diplomat
Kay Kinsman (1909–1998), Canadian artist and writer
Shane Kinsman (born 1997), American child actor
Thomas James Kinsman (1945–2017), U.S. Army soldier awarded the Medal of Honor
Paul Kinsman (1931–2014), Canadian physician and politician

Organizations
Kin Canada, a Canadian non-profit service organization also known as Kinsmen and Kinette Clubs
Kinsmen Field House, a multi-purpose sport and recreation facility
Kinsmen Stadium, the home of the Oshawa Dodgers

Vessels

USS Colonel Kinsman (1862), a gunboat captured by the Union Army during the American Civil War

Fiction
The Kinsman, a 1919 British silent comedy film 
Chet Kinsman, protagonist in a series of books by Ben Bova, including the novels "Kinsman" and "The Kinsman Saga"

Music
Kinsmen (album), a 2008 jazz album with saxophonist Rudresh Mahanthappa

See also
Kingsman (disambiguation)
King's Men (disambiguation)